Sambolero is a studio album by The João Donato Trio released by Universal Music Group on December 31, 2005. The album earned the Latin Grammy for Best Latin Jazz Album at the 11th Latin Grammy Awards.

Track listing
The track listing from Allmusic.

References

2005 albums
João Donato albums
Latin Grammy Award for Best Latin Jazz Album